|}

This is a list of House of Assembly results for the 1972 Tasmanian election.

Results by division

Bass

Braddon

Denison

Franklin

Wilmot 

38339

See also 

 1972 Tasmanian state election
 Members of the Tasmanian House of Assembly, 1972–1976
 Candidates of the 1972 Tasmanian state election

References 

Results of Tasmanian elections
1972 in Australia